Washakie may refer to:

People
Washakie, (ca. 1804–1900), a Shoshone chief
Washakie (McGary), sculpture depicting the chief

Places
Washakie, Utah, a ghost town
Washakie basin, a United States endorheic basin within the Wyoming Basin physiographic province
Washakie County, Wyoming
Washakie Glacier in Wyoming
Washakie National Forest in Wyoming
Washakie Reservation, the reservation of the Northwestern Band of the Shoshone Nation, in Utah
Washakie Ten, Wyoming, a census-designated place in Wyoming
Washakie Wilderness, a Wyoming protected area within the Shoshone National Forest

Ships
SS Chief Washakie, an American Liberty ship built in Portland, Oregon, in 1942
USS Washakie (YTB-386), later YTM-386, a United States Navy harbor tug in service from 1944 to 1946 and from 1953 to probably 1975